Frank John Magill (June 3, 1927 – June 2, 2013) was a United States circuit judge of the United States Court of Appeals for the Eighth Circuit.

Education and career 

Born in Verona, North Dakota on June 3, 1927, Magill served in the United States Navy as a seaman from 1945 to 1947. He received a Bachelor of Science in Foreign Service from Georgetown University School of Foreign Service in 1951, a Master of Arts from Columbia University in 1953, and a Bachelor of Laws from Georgetown University Law Center in 1955. He then worked in private law practice in Fargo, North Dakota until 1986.

Federal judicial service 

Following the recommendation of Senator Mark Andrews, on January 21, 1986, Magill was nominated by President Ronald Reagan to a seat on the United States Court of Appeals for the Eighth Circuit vacated by Judge Myron H. Bright. Magill was confirmed by the United States Senate on March 3, 1986, and received his commission on March 4, 1986. He took the oath and commenced service on April 1, 1986. Magill wrote several opinions in the noted case of Black Hills Institute of Geological Research v. U.S. Dept. of Justice, which dealt with the ownership of the fossil of a Tyrannosaurus rex named Sue.

Over the course of his service, Magill also sat by designation on a total of six cases heard in three other circuits - the Third, Fifth, and Ninth. Among the cases that Magill heard while sitting on the Ninth Circuit was Silveira v. Lockyer, in which the court, with Magill concurring, ruled that the Second Amendment to the United States Constitution did not guarantee individuals the right to bear arms.

Magill assumed senior status on April 1, 1997, serving in that status until his death.

Family 

Magill's daughter, M. Elizabeth Magill on January 13, 2022, was announced as the ninth president of the University of Pennsylvania, previously serving as the dean of Stanford Law School, and as the provost of the University of Virginia. https://www.inquirer.com/news/m-elizabeth-magill-university-pennsylvania-president-20220113.html.  Magill's son, Francis J. Magill, Jr., is a Minnesota District Court Judge.

Death

Magill died on June 2, 2013, in Fargo.

Notes

Sources
 

1927 births
2013 deaths
20th-century American judges
Columbia University alumni
Georgetown University Law Center alumni
Judges of the United States Court of Appeals for the Eighth Circuit
North Dakota lawyers
People from LaMoure County, North Dakota
Walsh School of Foreign Service alumni
United States court of appeals judges appointed by Ronald Reagan
United States Navy sailors